Pekisko is an unincorporated community in southern Alberta, Canada.

Oil and gas is an increasing part of the economy.

The name Pekisko originates from the Blackfoot language , meaning rolling foothills.

The Pekisko Formation (Mississippian limestone) of the Rundle Group was named after this community. A hybrid of Pisum sativum (pea) was also named Pekisko after this area.

Pekisko area ranches 

Pekisko is ranching country and two famous ranches operated there for decades: the Bar-U Ranch, owned by Calgary Stampede founder George Lane, and the EP Ranch (formerly the Bedingfeld Ranch).

After touring Canada in 1919, the Prince of Wales bought the Bedingfeld cattle ranch, which had been founded in 1886 by Mrs. Bedingfeld, a widow of a British army officer who died in India. The ranch became known as the Prince of Wales Ranch or the E.P. Ranch. The E.P. brand used on the ranch stood for "Edward Prince". The prince briefly became King of the United Kingdom and King of Canada in 1936. 

In 1925, cowboy movie star Hoot Gibson was filmed in scenes at the E.P. Ranch as part of the Hollywood movie The Calgary Stampede.

Climate

Climate

References

External links
Pekisko Group (Rangeland Conservation)

Localities in Foothills County